Florian Grassl (born 22 April 1980 in Freilassing) is a German skeleton racer who has competed since 2002. He won a silver medal in the men's skeleton event at the 2004 FIBT World Championships in Königssee.

Grassl took part in the 2005/2006 Skeleton World Cup trying to qualify for the 2006 Winter Olympics, but was unable to compete due to injury.

References

 BSD-portal profile 
 Eurosprt.de comment on Grassl's injury preventing him from competing in the 2006 Winter Olympics
 FIBT men's skeleton results: 1928–2005
 FIBT profile
 Skeletonsport.com profile

External links
 

1980 births
Living people
German male skeleton racers
People from Berchtesgadener Land
Sportspeople from Upper Bavaria
21st-century German people